Bonpas Township is located in Richland County, Illinois. As of the 2010 census, its population was 390 and it contained 160 housing units.

History
Bonpas Township was formed after an 1858 election, in which county voters chose to adopt a township-based model of county government, in place of the old precinct-based system.  Named for Bonpas Creek, which flows through its boundaries, the township was originally heavily wooded.  Early settlers favored this part of Richland County above others, but as experience taught the value of flat prairie ahead of hilly woodlands, the township languished.  Before the coming of the Ohio and Mississippi Railway, when good transportation was unavailable, most coal and stone used in Richland County came from Bonpas Township.

Geography

Demographics

References

External links
City-data.com
Illinois State Archives

Townships in Richland County, Illinois
Townships in Illinois